Cimaria is a genus of sea snails, marine gastropod mollusks in the family Pyramidellidae, the pyrams and their allies.

Species
There is only one species known to exist within the genus Cimaria, this includes the following:
 Cimaria vargasi Høisæter, 2012

References

External links
 To World Register of Marine Species

Pyramidellidae
Monotypic gastropod genera